St. Christopher's Cathedral in the Dutch city of Roermond is the main church of the Roman Catholic Diocese of Roermond. It is dedicated to Saint Christopher.

Location 
The cathedral is located on the market square, near the river Meuse and a Meuse fortress, on a pedestrian underpass leading to the outlet Centre.

History 
The construction of the Christoffelkerk, which began in 1410 and was initially designed as a basilica on a cruciform ground plan, was intended to replace an older parish church outside the walls of the town of Roermond. During the 15th century the building plans were changed; the choir was completed as a three-aisled hall, the nave was built with five naves.
The building was completed in the course of the 16th century. In 1661 the church was elevated to the status of bishop's church of the Roman Catholic Diocese of Roermond, established in 1559. The building includes stained glass by Dutch artist Joep Nicolas.

In World War II the church suffered heavy damage when German troops blew up the 78-metre-high tower built into the western part of the nave on the day before the liberation of the town by Allied troops. The tower has been restored to its old form after the war. The earthquake in the Roermond area in 1992 caused further damage. A new, comprehensive renovation took place in the years 2005 to 2007.

See also
 List of tallest structures built before the 20th century

External links 

 St. Christoffel Kathedraal Roermond (Dutch)

Roman Catholic cathedrals in the Netherlands
Bell towers in the Netherlands
Churches in Limburg (Netherlands)
Rijksmonuments in Limburg
Towers in Limburg (Netherlands)
Buildings and structures in Roermond
Gothic architecture in the Netherlands
16th-century Roman Catholic church buildings in the Netherlands